Malaal is a Pakistani drama television series which premiered on Hum TV on 9 October 2009. Produced by Momina Duraid, Malaal is the story that shows how wrong decisions can affect everyone’s lives and also focuses that how self centered-ness gets you nowhere.

The series marked the return of the duo, writer Umera Ahmad and director Mehreen Jabbar who previously collaborated for the hit serial Doraha.

Plot
The storyline revolves around Zinia and Danish who are close friends of ten years, living in the US. Both are secretly in love with each other. But when Danish goes to Pakistan to meet his mother Afia she rejects Zinia as she is too aged to be married. Then Danish is being married to a very young woman Mahi due to his mothers' insistence. She happily marries him and they both go to the US. Mahi also has an Internet friend Saifi who falls in love with Mahi and Savera her maternal cousin and best friend. When they arrive US, Mahi and Zinia become good friends and Zinia moves on.

Zinia makes friends with Jawad who turns out to be Mahi's cousin. Mahi, Zinia and Jawad start meeting frequently and so Jawad realises that he is in love with Zinia although she is a decade older than him. Zinia frequently meets with Jawad which upsets Danish and he starts fighting with Jawad and Mahi. But Zinia warns him and says him not to interfere in her personal life as he is married now. Mahi conceives and is pregnant

One time Zinia's best friend Lily comes to visit Zinia with her brother. Mahi also comes at the same time. Her brother is none other than Saifi. He now starts blackmailing Mahi and calling her. She disconnects the wire which causes disputes between Danish and her. One time Zinia also hears her phone call and so Mahi begs her not to say anything to Danish. She agrees.

Meanwhile, Jawad proposes to Zinia to which she reluctantly disagrees as she is elder to him by 8 years and his mother won't allow this marriage. She also starts liking him but she is scared as she could not hear another rejection. He says that he will convince her mother. Lily also thinks that Jawad is a perfect choice for Zinia. Danish tells Mahi that Zinia will never marry Jawad because she used to love him making Mahi upset

On the other hand, Saifi has sent all the emails to Danish and now Danish knows that Mahi previously had a boyfriend. He divorces her. He doesn't hear to anyone. Even Lily asks for forgiveness but he divorces Mahi. But now Mahi starts to hate him after learning that he loves Zinia and he wanted an excuse to leave her and she is also able to convince her mother Aliya and her father.

Jawad comes to Pakistan. Aliya's sister and Jawad's mother also tells Savera that Aliya wouldn't have done Mahi's marriage with Danish. Danish also proposes Zinia but Zinia starts hating him now. Danish sees a card in which Mahi had written Happy birthday Danish. He goes to Pakistan to convince to Mahi but Mahi rejects because she knows that he is a selfish person and is doing as Zinia had rejected him.

On the other hand, when Jawad expresses feelings for Zinia to her mother, she rejects and starts shouting at him. She doesn't listen to her husband Ibrahim. She talks to Afia about the same. But when Jawad says that he will only marry Zinia and he will marry her only if his mother is convinced, She is convinced but gives a condition. He goes back to New York to meet Zinia and so she lies to him that she has married Danish and he says that his mother had rejected him. After few days they meet each other where Zinia says she hadn't married Danish and had lied because she knew that Jawad's mother has rejected her. Jawad says that he had also lied. His mother had given the condition to Zinia that she has to leave New York. She can work in Pakistan. Zinia accepts and they end the show together.

Cast 
 Imran Abbas as Jawad Ibrahim
 Faisal Rehman as Danish
 Sarwat Gilani as Mahi
 Deepti Gupta as Zinia
 Tania Kazi as Lily, Saifi's sister
 Adeel Ahmed as Saifi
 Shamim Hilaly as Afia
 Shehryar Zaidi as Mahi's father
 Badar Khalil as Mahi's mother
 Ismat Zaidi as Jawad mother
 Sanam Agha as Jawad's sister
 Raju Jamil as Ibrahim Ahmed, Jawad's father

Broadcast and release
Malaal was dubbed in Arabic with name "حب و ندم" and was broadcast by MBC in the Middle East.  
It was also aired in India on Zindagi, premiering on 19 October 2015. The show ended its run in India on 4 November 2015. The television serial was also made available on streaming platform MX Player.

Accolades
 Lux Style Awards - Best TV Serial - Nominated

See also 
 Noorpur Ki Rani
 Aashti
 Mannchalay
 Doraha
 Manay Na Ye Dil
 Dil, Diya, Dehleez (TV series)

References

External links

2009 Pakistani television series debuts
2010 Pakistani television series endings
Pakistani drama television series
Urdu-language television shows
Television shows set in Karachi
Hum TV original programming
Mehreen Jabbar's directions